Nicos Panayiotou (born December 6, 1970) is a former international Cypriot football goalkeeper.
He started his career from Anorthosis. He played there for seventeen years. He was the captain of Anorthosis. Then, he moved to AEK Larnaca where he played for a year and after to Panachaiki for another year and finished his career at 2007 playing for Ayia Napa. He was in charge of Anorthosis's academies.

External links

References

1970 births
Living people
AEK Larnaca FC players
Anorthosis Famagusta F.C. players
Panachaiki F.C. players
Ayia Napa FC players
Cypriot footballers
Cyprus international footballers
Greek Cypriot people
Association football goalkeepers
Cypriot football managers
People from Famagusta
Ermis Aradippou FC managers
Cyprus U17 national football team managers